was a town located in Hamana District, Shizuoka Prefecture, Japan.

On July 1, 2005, Yūtō, along with the cities of Tenryū and Hamakita, town of Haruno (from Shūchi District), the towns of Hosoe, Inasa and Mikkabi (all from Inasa District), the towns of Misakubo and Sakuma, the village of Tatsuyama (all from Iwata District), and the town of Maisaka (also from Hamana District), was merged into the expanded city of Hamamatsu.

Yūtō was located on the eastern banks of Lake Hamana just north of Maisaka Station on the JR Tōkaidō line.

Prior to its merger with Hamamatsu, Yūtō enjoyed a sister city relationship with Airdrie, Alberta, Canada. This relationship was founded on July 4, 1995.

Attractions
Yūtō-chō Culture Center - https://www.mb.epss.jp/contents/facilities/1410/index.html (Japanese)
Hamanako Royal Hotel - http://www.inhamamatsu.com/hotel/hamanako-royal-hotel.php
"Takiya Ryo" Fishing - https://japan-highlightstravel.com/en/travel/hamamatsu/090047/- A description of this kind of fishing which is done at nighttime with lamps, harpoons, and nets.

Famous people
Shinichirô Sawai (澤井信一郎 ) - Movie Director
Hironoshin Furuhashi (古橋廣之進 ) - Honorary President of the Japan Swimming Federation
Yoko Kando (漢人陽子) - Barcelona Olympic Team Member

References

External links
Shinichirô Sawai's Page on IMDB
Furuhashi Hironoshin, Honorary Citizen of Yuto Town - Hamamatsu City Information, Hamamatsu Regional Resource Information Management Project
Young Friends Say Sayonara - Airdrie Echo, Article about the former sister-city relationship

Dissolved municipalities of Shizuoka Prefecture
Hamamatsu